San Felipe Municipality may refer to:
 San Felipe Municipality, Baja California, Mexico
 San Felipe Municipality, Yaracuy, Venezuela
 San Felipe Municipality, Yucatán, Mexico